Shirley Fitzpatrick-Wong (born December 19, 1971) is a Canadian international lawn bowler.

Bowls career
She won a silver medal in the fours with Andrea Weigand, Melissa Ranger and Anita Nivala at the 2002 Commonwealth Games. 

Two years later she won a bronze medal at the 2004 World Outdoor Bowls Championship - Women's Pairs with her mother Clarice Fitzpatrick. She plays for the Sargent Park Bowling Club.

In 2007 she won the pairs silver medal and fours bronze medal at the Atlantic Bowls Championships.

References

1971 births
Living people
Bowls players at the 2002 Commonwealth Games
Canadian female bowls players
Commonwealth Games medallists in lawn bowls
Sportspeople from Winnipeg
Commonwealth Games silver medallists for Canada
21st-century Canadian women
Medallists at the 2002 Commonwealth Games